Néstor Ruben Contreras Palma (born February 26, 1979) is a Chilean former footballer.

Honours

Club
Deportes Iquique
 Copa Chile (1): 2010
 Primera B (1): 2010

San Marcos de Arica
 Primera B de Chile (1): 2012 Apertura

References
 
 

1979 births
Living people
Chilean footballers
Cobresal footballers
Audax Italiano footballers
Deportes Iquique footballers
San Marcos de Arica footballers
Santiago Morning footballers
Rangers de Talca footballers
Deportes Melipilla footballers
Deportes Concepción (Chile) footballers
San Luis de Quillota footballers
Chilean Primera División players
Primera B de Chile players
Association football midfielders